Airport Route Recordings or Airport Route is a dance music progressive house label based in Reykjavík, Iceland.

Starting in 2007 as a digital download only label, Airport Routes music have received attention from some of the biggest DJs in dance.

Its biggest release to date has been from Pete Lunn with his "Seasider" album.

The concept of Airport Route in more community based and as a label it works in birthing new talent both home and abroad, its helpful approach aimed at encouraging people in switching from home artist to recognised released names, as demonstrated with acts like Metadeko, Megaman and Johann Stone.
In this vain the Audio 101:Reykjavík compilation saw debut releases from half of the titles involved.

In its genre they have still huge growth too in its attention, with at least one mix from each release having a DJ name supporting.

Artist include, Pete Lunn, Simon Latham, Metadeko, Ingi, Pluggd, Megaman and Johann Stone.

References

External links 
 www.airportroute.com
 Airport Route @ Discogs

Companies based in Reykjavík
Electronic dance music record labels
House music record labels
Icelandic record labels
Record labels established in 2007